Riccardo Muccioli (born 27 August 1974) is a retired international footballer from San Marino who last played club football for U.S. Savarna in Italy. He previously played for SC Faetano and USC Baracca Lugo 1909.

External links

1974 births
Living people
Sammarinese footballers
San Marino international footballers
Association football midfielders